Nipponoharpalus discrepans is a species of beetle in the family Carabidae, the only species in the genus Nipponoharpalus. Nippon refers to the location where it is found, Japan

References

Harpalinae